Brenneke GmbH is a German manufacturer of ammunition and bullets, based in Langenhagen, Lower Saxony.

The company was founded by Wilhelm Brenneke in 1895 and is currently owned and run by his great-grandson, Dr. Peter Mank.

Brenneke makes shotgun shells for target shooting and hunting, special slugs for law enforcement, and hunting rounds as well as projectiles for handloading. Its best-known products are the Brenneke slug for shotguns and a line of rifle bullets.

Langenhagen standard 
In 1990 under the sponsorship of Brenneke, the Langenhagen standard was created. Essentially it means that for hunting, the deviation of the shotgun slug must not on a distance of  exceed a circle with  diameter. On a drilling, the total deviation of all three barrels must not exceed a circle of  diameter.

Rifle bullets
All Brenneke rifle bullets have a so-called torpedo-tail, a special form of boat-tail.

The best-known are
 TIG, mainly a fragmentation bullet with a soft core for smaller game, developed in 1917-1927.
 TUG, mainly a deformation bullet with a hard core for bigger game, developed 1935.

From 1935 to 2003, Brenneke concentrated on improving the Brenneke slug. since 2003, the firm developed the
 TOG (2003), a deformation-bullet for big game
 TAG (2007), a lead-free deformation bullet.

Lead-free versions of TIG and TUG are built as "TIG nature" and "TUG nature".

Brenneke TIG and TUG against RWS ID and UNI 
From 1972 until 2006, those were manufactured and developed in license by RWS; in 2006, the license was not renewed, and RWS began marketing the bullets as ID-Classic resp. UNI-Classic from 1 July 2006 onward. In February 2009, Brenneke declared it saw ID-Classic and UNI-classic as counterfeit consumer goods and launched a lawsuit against RUAG Amotec.

Brenneke markets the bullets, as well as ammunition, from a different manufacturer under its own name now.

Calibers 
Wilhelm Brenneke developed some rifle cartridges. Normally, those have a brass length of  rimless resp.  flanged for combination guns and other break-action-rifles that are still popular with European hunters. Those calibers are in exclusive civil use; thus, they are tremendously popular in countries that ban military calibers like France. Those are:
 7×64mm / 7x65mm R (1917–1927)
 8×64mm S (1912) / 8x65mm RS
 9.3×64mm Brenneke (1927)

External links 
 Company history

References 

Manufacturing companies established in 1895
Ammunition manufacturers
Manufacturing companies of Germany
Companies based in Lower Saxony
1895 establishments in Germany